Last Window: The Secret of Cape West, known in Japan as , is an adventure video game developed by Cing and published by Nintendo for the Nintendo DS handheld game console. It is the sequel to Hotel Dusk: Room 215, starring protagonist Kyle Hyde, and takes place one year after those events. Set in 1980 Los Angeles, the Cape West Apartments, the story deals with a new mystery in a new location, but it also delves into some unanswered questions from Kyle Hyde's past. Last Window was the last game developed by Cing before the company filed for bankruptcy on March 1, 2010. Unlike its predecessor, it was never released in North America.

Gameplay
The Nintendo DS is held vertically, like a book. Last Window introduces an 'Ignore' feature which allows the player to let go the lines of questioning they don't find useful. Ignoring too many lines of questioning, as well as not ignoring enough, may cause an early game over.

A new story-based feature is the in-game novel Last Window. Every time a chapter of the game is cleared, a new chapter in the Last Window book is made available. The contents of the book complements the game's story, and they can be influenced by the decisions the player makes.

The player can unlock a "Pinkie Rabbit Land" mini-game by either completing the story or by winning it in an optional in-game prize-contest. The game is in the style of a handheld electronic game from the time period of Last Window, based around fictional cartoon character "Pinkie Rabbit". Post-game, the player also unlocks the ability to play the 9-ball mini-game whenever they want.

Plot 
Los Angeles, 1980. In Cape West Apartments, a soon-to-be-demolished apartment block, ex-detective Kyle Hyde receives a mysterious letter. While everyone has secrets and parts of their past they would rather leave buried, for Hyde, the case is taking a more personal twist. As he investigates, Hyde uncovers a story that links his fellow residents, a priceless diamond, and the death of his father.

Reception

Last Window: The Secret of Cape West received "favorable" reviews according to the review aggregation website GameRankings. In a Kotaku retrospective, Peter Tieryas described the game as one of the best murder mysteries in gaming and that "the narrative is much more organic and one reveal ends up being just one small glimpse through the window of their lives". In Japan, Famitsu gave it a score of one nine, two eights, and one seven for a total of 32 out of 40.

References

External links

Official European website
Official Japanese website

2010 video games
Adventure games
Cing games
Detective video games
Neo-noir video games
Nintendo games
Nintendo DS games
Nintendo DS-only games
Video game sequels
Video games developed in Japan
Video games set in 1955
Video games set in 1967
Video games set in 1980
Video games set in Los Angeles
Video games with rotoscoped graphics
Visual novels
Single-player video games